Amaanat is a 1977 Bollywood film directed by Shatrujiit Paul. It stars Manoj Kumar, Sadhana, Balraj Sahni, Mehmood, Rehman, Shashikala, Aruna Irani in pivotal roles. The film took 8 years in making.

Story
Suresh is a painter who lives a contented life with wife, son and his work. One day, a lady asks him to make a portrait of her, for which she will give him Rupees 2,000. He agrees and next day he goes to the lady's house. She seduces him and her husband catches her with Suresh. A fight ensues between the husband and wife with the wife killing the husband. She puts the blame on Suresh. Suresh manages to escape and leaves the place abandoning his wife and child.

While on the train, a man asks Suresh to take care of his wife and baby girl who are travelling alone for first time. Suresh agrees. The train meets with an accident and the lady dies. Suresh takes the baby entrusted in his care and starts looking after her as his daughter.

Suresh's wife has been left to fend for herself and her son. She starts working as a maid to earn a livelihood. Her employer offers to adopt the son and provide him with an education and clothes to wear and food to eat. She agrees to leave her son in his care so as to give him a good life.

Several years pass and Deepak falls in love with Suresh's adopted daughter Suchitra. After several eventful incidents in their lives, Deepak gets his love Suchitra, and Suresh gets justice and is reunited with his wife and son.

Cast
Manoj Kumar as Deepak
Sadhana as Suchitra 
Balraj Sahni as Suresh
Mehmood as Mahesh
Rehman as Amar
Shashikala as Sonia
Aruna Irani as Flora D'Costa
Achala Sachdev as Shanti
Mukri as Lobo
Asit Sen as Mr. D'Costa
Dheeraj Kumar as Mohan
Krishan Dhawan as Mohan's Father
Praveen Paul as Mohan's Mother
Brahm Bhardwaj as Mohan's Grandfather

Soundtrack
The music of the film was composed by Ravi and penned by Sahir Ludhianvi. Mohammed Rafi sang the most memorable songs: "Door Rehkar Na Karo Baat Kareeb Aa Jao", "Matlab Nikal Gaya To Pehchante Nahin" and "Teri Jawani Tapta Mahina".

References

External links
 

1967 films
1970s Hindi-language films
Films scored by Ravi